Sun-chang Lo is a photographer, artist, architect.

Early life

Sun-chang Lo is a Chinese American photographer, artist, architect. Born in Guangzhou, China, and has lived and studied in Taiwan, Japan, Hong Kong and the United States.

Following graduation from the Cooper Union, New York City, in 1972, he was a recipient of the Japanese Monbukagakusho Scholarship from 1974 to 1976. While studying under Professor Kazuo Shinohara at the Tokyo Institute of Technology, analysis and synthesis of the theories and histories of Chinese and Japanese architecture landed him two consecutive awards in the 1975 and 1976 Japan Architect International Residential Competitions.

Architecture, design and photography

From 1977 to 1979, while participating in the Lukang Landmark Preservation Project, he taught architecture and design at Tunghai University, Taiwan. Back in his New York City home base, he and his wife/partner, Jean, pursued a multi-discipline design practice ranging from architecture, interior, fashion and graphic design, to photography, surveying and model making.

From 1993 to 2008 he taught art and architecture, design, drawing and photography at the Department of Architecture at the University of Hong Kong.

Currently
In 2008, Sun-chang Lo was referenced in the Hong Kong Art Archive.

He is now a freelance architect/artist/photographer living in New York city.

Books 
Hong Kong: A Micro Vision/Photographs Sun-chang Lo Illustrated. 124 pages. The University Museum and Art Gallery, The University of Hong Kong. 
Hong Kong: A Macro Vision/Drawings Sun-chang Lo Illustrated. 120 pages. The University Museum and Art Gallery, The University of Hong Kong. 
Metropolis: A Prime Vision/Photographs Sun-chang Lo Illustrated. 136 pages. The University Museum and Art Gallery, The University of Hong Kong. 
Metropolis: An Omni Vision/Drawings Sun-chang Lo Illustrated. 104 pages. The University Museum and Art Gallery, The University of Hong Kong. 
Pilgrimage : A Naked Vision/Photographs Sun-chang Lo Illustrated. 132 pages. The University Museum and Art Gallery, The University of Hong Kong. 
16 Lessons in Lines: 50th Anniversary Exhibition, Illustrated. 250 pages. The University Museum and Art Gallery, The University of Hong Kong. 
Mindscape: An Epic Vision/Photographs Sun-chang Lo Illustrated. 132 pages. The University Museum and Art Gallery, The University of Hong Kong. 
Sun-chang Lo’s Metropolis Sun-chang Lo Illustrated. 72 pages. Cultural & Recreational Services of the Civic & Municipal Affairs Bureau, Macau

Exhibitions

Solo 
Mindscape: An Epic Vision/Photographs by Sun-chang Lo
Creek Art, Shanghai, 2008.
Sun-chang Lo's Metropolis
The Taipa Houses Museum, Macau, 2004.
Nudes and Naked Calligraphy/Works by Jean and Sun-chang Lo
The University Museum and Art Gallery, The University of Hong Kong, 2003.
Metropolis: A Prime Vision/Photographs by Sun-chang Lo
Kwai Fung Hin Art Gallery, Hong Kong, 2001.
Metropolis: A Prime Vision/Photographs by Sun-chang Lo
Edward Carter Gallery, New York, 2001.
Metropolis: Fotografias e Desenhos de Sun-chang Lo
Galeria da Livraria Portuguesa, Instituto Português do Oriente, Macau, 2001.
Photography by Sun-chang Lo
Art Sites Gallery, Greenport, New York, 2000.
Hong Kong: A Macro Vision/Drawings by Sun-chang Lo
The University Museum and Art Gallery, The University of Hong Kong, 1997.
Hong Kong: A Micro Vision/Photographs by Sun-chang Lo
Princeton University, 1996.
Hong Kong: A Micro Vision/Photographs by Sun-chang Lo
The University Museum and Art Gallery, The University of Hong Kong, 1995.

Group
Hong Kong & Shenzhen Bi-City Biennale of Urbanism/Architecture
Central, Hong Kong, 2008.
Lianzhou International Photo Festival
Lianzhou, Guangdong, China, 2007.
Lishui International Photo Festival
Lishui, Zhejiang, China, 2007.
16 Lessons in Lines
The University Museum and Art Gallery, The University of Hong Kong, 1999.
Five Contemporary Chinese Photographers
The Rotunda, Exchange Square, Hong Kong, 1997

References

External links
Artist's website

Chinese architects
Chinese photographers
Living people
Artists from Guangzhou
Year of birth missing (living people)
Cooper Union alumni
Photographers from New York City